Célia Mara (born July 27, 1961) is a Brazilian singer-songwriter and producer who has lived since the 1990s in Vienna, Austria and since 2003 also partly in Salvador, Bahia.

Style
She defines herself as "bastardista": violating race, gender and class structures; a hybrid; mostly women made, mestizo mixed, out of rules, illegitimate, from an impure race...; or "nu Brazilian flavor", presenting a Latinized worldbeat – multicultural world music with strong Brazilian roots, singing in Portuguese, English, German, French and Spanish.
Célia Mara is part of the famous movement – famous: platform for famous female culture.

Célia Mara was born in Pedra Azul, Minas Gerais, a small town in the Vale do Jequitinhonha, one of today's poorest regions of the world. Politically, she grew up under a military regime. She began her musical career as a 14-year-old girl, as an autodidact on the guitar. Highly influenced by the revolutionary Tropicalismo, she started early to play songs from Caetano veloso, Gilberto Gil, Chico Buarque but also from Mercedes Sosa and her own compositions on local events. In 1979, she was the first girl (and Female composer) of the Vale de Jequintinhonha participating to a regional event, "Los procurados" festival, organized by Tadeu Martins. Later she lived in Belo Horizonte, (had shows at cabare mineiro, "Palacio das Artes") performing as well in Rio de Janeiro and Sao Paulo sesc Pompeia, presenting a fusion between rural and urban songs. TV appearances such as in Som Brasil de Rolando Boldrin, in Rede Globo gave a push to her career.

Europe
In the early 1990s, her first European tour brought her to small clubs and minor festivals in Germany, Switzerland, Austria and Northern Italy. In 1993, she moved to Austria, having a solo and duo-career, performing at important regional jazz festivals Jazzfestival–Burghausen and Jazzfest–Jena. In 1997, she founded the Austria-based Latin-band potênciaX – with Herwig Gradischnig, Ingrid Oberkanins and others. Using of sound-programs, she was influenced by bastard pop and the art of remixing.

Célia Mara's "bastardsound" is a central-European-Brazilian mix, connected with the Spanish mestiço-movement – Manu Chao, Amparo Sanchez, Ojos de Brujo, viennese fusion Joe Zawinul and Brazilian music Tom Zé, Vanessa da Mata, Seu Jorge, Lenine, Carlinhos Brown.

Célia Mara is managed and produced since 1996 by Silvia Jura Santangelo. They run the label: globalista: no border media.

On March 8, 2011, Célia Mara got the Austrian Citizenship by honor.

Discography 
 Santa Rebeldia (2008; globaCD_SR08)
 Bastardista (2005; globa_CD05)
 Necessàrio – live at ORF Radiokulturhaus (2000; art libre/ORF globa_CD00)
 Hot Couture do samba (1998; art libre) globa_CD98)

Awards 
 2000: Concerto Poll: best world music artist Austria
 2003: herta pammer preis for the event: culture is our weapon
 2006: copa da cultura,Brazilian culture export award for Bastardista

Notes

References 
World Music
Fly Global Music
Funk Haus Euuropa
Many Musics
Vienna Jazz

External links 
 célia mara's site
 célia mara's myspace

1961 births
Living people
21st-century Brazilian women singers
21st-century Brazilian singers
Brazilian record producers
Brazilian songwriters
Austrian people of Brazilian descent
English-language singers from Brazil
Feminist musicians
French-language singers
German-language singers
Spanish-language singers of Brazil
Latin pop singers
People from Belo Horizonte
Women record producers
20th-century Brazilian women singers
20th-century Brazilian singers